Uproar may refer to:
A brouhaha, a state of social agitation when a minor incident gets out of control
A protest
"Uproar" (Anne Murray song), 1975
"Uproar" (Lil Wayne song), 2018
, British Royal Navy U-class submarine